Cullen is a genus of legumes (family Fabaceae) native to tropical, subtropical and arid regions of Africa, Asia and Australia. Despite the origin implied in the name of the constituent species Cullen americanum, legumes of this genus are not native to the Americas.

Cullen was previously included in broad definitions of the allied genus Psoralea.

References

Psoraleeae
Fabaceae genera